is a professional Japanese baseball player. He plays outfielder for the Chiba Lotte Marines. Oka is known as person that he has the same name as heroine of Aim for the Ace!, Japanese animation. Oka is outfielder but he had worn No. 18, it is known as uniform number that great pitcher wear in Japanese professional baseball, from 2017 to 2018.

External links

 NPB.com

1991 births
Living people
Baseball people from Okayama Prefecture
People from Kurashiki
Meiji University alumni
Nippon Professional Baseball outfielders
Hokkaido Nippon-Ham Fighters players
Chiba Lotte Marines players
Criollos de Caguas players
Japanese expatriate baseball players in Puerto Rico